Bilal Farooq Tarar (born 20 December 1987) is a Pakistani politician who had been a Member of the Provincial Assembly of the Punjab from August 2018 till January 2023.

Early life 
He was born on 20 December 1987 in Lahore who is the younger brother of Attaullah Tarar who is also a politician and the grandson of late Ex-President of Pakistan Muhammad Rafiq Tarar.

Political career

He was elected to the Provincial Assembly of the Punjab as a candidate of Pakistan Muslim League (N) from Constituency PP-53 (Gujranwala-III) in 2018 Pakistani general election.

References

Living people
Punjab MPAs 2018–2023
Pakistan Muslim League (N) MPAs (Punjab)
1987 births